The Iron Duke is a 1934 British historical film directed by Victor Saville and starring George Arliss, Ellaline Terriss and Gladys Cooper. Arliss plays Arthur Wellesley, Duke of Wellington in the events leading up to the Battle of Waterloo and beyond.

Plot
With Napoleon defeated and exiled, the reluctant Duke of Wellington is persuaded by Lord Castelreagh to represent Great Britain's interests at the Congress of Vienna, where the victorious allies will decide the future of Europe. While there, his friend the Duchess of Richmond introduces the married man to the pretty Lady Frances Webster, an ardent admirer, at her ball. During the course of the evening, however, Wellington receives an urgent message: Napoleon has escaped and has landed in France.

French King Louis XVIII and his niece and most trusted adviser, Madame, the Duchess d'Angoulême, are not alarmed in the least. Ney, formerly one of Napoleon's marshals, volunteers to take 4000 picked men and capture his former leader. However, he switches sides, and the majority of Frenchmen follow suit.

With France once again under Napoleon's control, both sides race to gather their armies. Napoleon routs the Prussians under Marshal Blücher before coming to grips with his old nemesis Wellington at the Battle of Waterloo. At the crucial point of the battle, Blücher's timely arrival turns the tide, and Napoleon is defeated for the final time.

The allies occupy France and gather in Paris to divide the spoils. Once again, Castelreagh sends Wellington to try to restrain the others from punishing France too severely, in order to ensure a lasting peace. Wellington's task is made more difficult by the opposition of Madame, who is certain he wants to rule France himself.

Wellington warns Louis that Madame's desire to have the still-popular Ney executed for treason would risk another revolution. Madame arranges for Wellington's recall to London to answer a newspaper story that he is carrying on an affair with Lady Frances. Wellington soon disproves the claim, but while he is gone, Ney is convicted and shot by firing squad. The French people are outraged. Upon his return, Wellington forces the King to dismiss his advisers, including Madame.

Back in London, Wellington has to defend his decision to accept no reparations for his country.

Cast
 George Arliss as Arthur Wellesley, Duke of Wellington
 Ellaline Terriss as Catherine Wellesley, Duchess of Wellington
 Gladys Cooper as Madame, Duchess d'Angoulême
 A. E. Matthews as Lord Hill
 Allan Aynesworth as Louis XVIII
 Lesley Wareing as Lady Frances Webster
 Emlyn Williams as Bates, the reporter who writes the story that bedevils Wellington
 Edmund Willard as Marshal Ney
 Norma Varden as Charlotte Lennox, Duchess of Richmond
 Felix Aylmer as Lord Uxbridge
 Gerald Lawrence as Lord Castelreagh
 Gibb McLaughlin as Talleyrand
 Farren Soutar as Count Metternich
 Walter Sondes as James Wedderburn Webster, Lady Frances' jealous husband
 Frederick Leister as King of Prussia
 Gyles Isham as Czar of Russia
 Annie Esmond as Denise
 Paddy Naismith as Lady Frances' Maid (as Paddie Naismith)
 Ernest Jay as First Orderly
 G. H. Mulcaster as First Delegate
 Frank Freeman as Second Delegate
 Franklin Dyall as Marshal Blücher
 Campbell Gullan as D'Artois
 Norman Shelley as Pozzo di Borgo
 Peter Gawthorne as Duke of Richmond

Reception
The film was the ninth most popular at the British box office in 1935–36.

The New York Times reviewer wrote, "The Iron Duke can be recommended to Mr. Arliss's admirers everywhere as a pseudo-historical drama which manages to be both impressive and amusing and which reveals the star at his very best". The Maclean's magazine critic complained that "The picture went on quite a long time after Waterloo, however, without a great deal of story to go on" and that "George Arliss, however, with his familiar blend of elderly gentlemanly oddity and amiability, didn't seem very fortunately cast as a warrior, especially a warrior on the grand scale of the Duke of Wellington."

More recently, TV Guide gave the film two out of four stars, and wrote, "Not only are the pace and direction of The Iron Duke uninspired and haphazard, but the script is rife with historical inaccuracies, the glossing over of less flattering events, and definite misrepresentation in the case of Marshal Ney's (Willard) execution". Britmovie called the film a "colourful yet flat historical drama", though it praised George Arliss, "who was skilled at playing historical characters and delivers a typically perceptive performance."

Notes

References

External links

1934 films
1930s historical films
British black-and-white films
British biographical films
British historical films
Films directed by Victor Saville
Films set in the 1810s
Films set in Brussels
Films set in Paris
Films set in London
Films set in Vienna
Napoleonic Wars films
Cultural depictions of Arthur Wellesley, 1st Duke of Wellington
Cultural depictions of Klemens von Metternich
Cultural depictions of Gebhard Leberecht von Blücher
Cultural depictions of Charles Maurice de Talleyrand-Périgord
Films set in the Austrian Empire
Films shot at Lime Grove Studios
Gainsborough Pictures films
1930s English-language films
1930s British films